William Harding of Baraset (1759–1822) was Gentleman of the Privy Chamber to George III, magistrate and deputy lieutenant of Warwickshire.
According to the BBC, he was born in 1760 and went to India as a civil servant in the East India Company.

References

1759 births
1822 deaths
People from Warwickshire (before 1974)
Gentlemen of the Privy Chamber